Raúl Martín (born 3 July 1941) is a Cuban former swimmer. He competed in two events at the 1956 Summer Olympics.

References

1941 births
Living people
Cuban male swimmers
Olympic swimmers of Cuba
Swimmers at the 1956 Summer Olympics
Place of birth missing (living people)